Szy may refer to:

 szy, the ISO 639-3 language code for the Sakizaya language
 SZY, the IATA code for Olsztyn-Mazury Airport, Poland